Anthony Allison is an American politician and retired electrician serving as a member of the New Mexico House of Representatives from the 4th district, which includes San Juan County, New Mexico.

Early life and education 
Allison is a member of the Navajo Nation. After graduating from Gallup High School, Allison attended Eastern New Mexico University for two years.

Career 
Prior to his retirement, Allison worked as a journeyman electrician. He also founded Navajo Voters Coalition, an organization specializing in the expansion of voting rights in his district. He defeated incumbent Republican Sharon Clahchischilliage in the 2018 election and took office on January 15, 2019.

References 

Democratic Party members of the New Mexico House of Representatives
Navajo people
Navajo Nation politicians
American electricians
Year of birth missing (living people)
Living people
Eastern New Mexico University alumni
21st-century Native Americans